Abu al-Fayz Khan (alternative spellings Abul Faiz Khan, Abulfayz Khan; 1687-1747) was the Janid ruler of the Khanate of Bukhara from 1711 to 1747. It was during the rule of Abu al-Fayz Khan that Janid rule lost its authority in the khanate of Bukhara.

Defeat by Nader Shah
Abu al-Fayz surrendered the khanate to Nader Shah in 1740 in response to Nader Shah's broader conquest of central Asia. Some accounts say that Abu al-Fayz surrendered without a fight, others say that he was defeated in battle. The two rulers reached an agreement in which Abu al-Fayz was confirmed as king of Turkestan, Nader Shah married Abu al-Fayz's daughter, and Muhammad Hakim Khan, a quasi-independent governor of Qarshi, was appointed as the ataliq. By the time Nadir Shah defeated Abu al-Fayz the khanate of Bukhara existed only in name. Samarkand, Hisar, and Shahrisabz had had de facto independence for decades prior. Nader Shah did not help the economic status of Bukhara and instead exhausted Bukhara's resources for his own war campaigns. Abu al-Fayz saw this as an opportunity to remove his own political competition, and suggested that Nader Shah conscript tribal leaders that were politically troublesome for Abu al-Fayz.

Execution by Muhammad Rahim Bey
After rebellions broke out in Transoxania in 1743 that lead to the death of Muhammad Hakim, Nader Shah sent Hakim's son, Muhammad Rahim Bey, with four thousand Qizilbash to help Abu al-Fayz Khan pacify the rebellions. After the death of Nader Shah in 1747, Muhammad Rahim Bey executed Abu al-Fayz Khan and established the Mangit dynasty.

Notes

References 

 

1687 births
1747 deaths
Khanate of Bukhara